Iceland national basketball team is a name given to national basketball teams from Iceland and may refer to:

Men's teams
Iceland men's national basketball team
Iceland men's national under-20 basketball team
Iceland men's national under-18 basketball team
Iceland men's national under-16 basketball team

Women's teams
Iceland women's national basketball team
Iceland women's national under-20 basketball team
Iceland women's national under-18 basketball team
Iceland women's national under-16 basketball team